The University of the Witwatersrand, Johannesburg, is a multi-campus South African public research university situated in the northern areas of central Johannesburg. It is more commonly known as Wits University or Wits ( or ). The university has its roots in the mining industry, as do Johannesburg and the Witwatersrand in general. Founded in 1896 as the South African School of Mines in Kimberley, it is the third oldest South African university in continuous operation.

The university has an enrolment of 40,259 students as of 2018, of which approximately 20 percent live on campus in the university's 17 residences. 63 percent of the university's total enrolment is for undergraduate study, with 35 percent being postgraduate and the remaining 2 percent being Occasional Students.

The 2017 Academic Ranking of World Universities (ARWU) places Wits University, with its overall score, as the highest ranked university in Africa. Wits was ranked as the top university in South Africa in the Center for World University Rankings (CWUR) in 2016. According to the CWUR rankings, Wits occupies this ranking position since 2014.

History

Early years: 1896–1922
The university was founded in Kimberley in 1896 as the South African School of Mines. It is the third oldest South African university in continuous operation, after the University of Cape Town (founded in 1829), and Stellenbosch University (founded in 1866). Eight years later, in 1904, the school was moved to Johannesburg and renamed the Transvaal Technical Institute. The school's name changed yet again in 1906 to Transvaal University College. In 1908, a new campus of the Transvaal University College was established in Pretoria. The Johannesburg and Pretoria campuses separated on 17 May 1910, each becoming a separate institution. The Johannesburg campus was reincorporated as the South African School of Mines and Technology, while the Pretoria campus remained the Transvaal University College until 1930 when it became the University of Pretoria. In 1920, the school was renamed the University College, Johannesburg.

Open years: 1922–1959
Finally, on 1 March 1922, the University College, Johannesburg, was granted full university status after being incorporated as the University of the Witwatersrand. The Johannesburg municipality donated a site in Milner Park, north-west of Braamfontein, to the new institution as its campus and construction began the same year, on 4 October. The first Chancellor of the new university was Prince Arthur of Connaught and the first Principal (a position that would be merged with that of Vice-Chancellor in 1948) was Professor Jan Hofmeyr. Hofmeyr set the tone of the university's subsequent opposition to apartheid when, during his inaugural address as Principal he declared, while discussing the nature of a university and its desired function in a democracy, that universities "should know no distinctions of class, wealth, race or creed". True to Hofmeyr's words, from the outset Wits was an open university with a policy of non-discrimination on racial or any other grounds.

Initially, there were six faculties—Arts, Science, Medicine, Engineering, Law and Commerce—37 departments, 73 academic staff, and approximately 1,000 students. In 1923, the university began moving into the new campus, slowly vacating its former premises on Ellof Street for the first completed building in Milner Park: the Botany and Zoology Block. In 1925, the Prince of Wales (the future Edward VIII) officially opened Central Block (which includes the Great Hall).

The university's first library, housed at the time in what was meant to be a temporary construction, was destroyed in a fire on Christmas Eve in 1931. Following this, an appeal was made to the public for £80,000 to pay for the construction of a new library, and the acquisition of books. This resulted in the fairly rapid construction of the William Cullen Library; opened in 1934. During this period, as the Great Depression hit South Africa, the university was faced with severe financial restrictions. Nonetheless, it continued to grow at an impressive rate. From a total enrolment of 2,544 students in 1939, the university grew to 3,100 in 1945. This growth led to accommodation problems, which were temporarily resolved by the construction of wood and galvanised-iron huts in the centre of the campus (which remained in use until 1972).

During World War II, Wits was involved in South Africa's war efforts. The Bernard Price Institute of Geophysical Research was placed under the Union of South Africa's defence ministry, and was involved in important research into the use of radar. Additionally, an elite force of female soldiers was trained on the university's campus.

In 1948 the National Party (NP) was voted into power by South Africa's white electorate, and apartheid (Afrikaans for "separateness") policies started to become law. The racist separation policies sparked a response, in 1957, by Wits, the University of Cape Town, Rhodes University and the University of Natal, who issued a joint statement entitled "The Open Universities in South Africa", committing themselves to the principles of university autonomy and academic freedom.

In 1959, the apartheid government's Extension of University Education Act forced restricted registrations of black students for most of the apartheid era; despite this, several notable black leaders graduated from the university. Wits protested strongly and continued to maintain a firm and consistent stand in opposition to apartheid. This marked the beginning of a period of conflict with the apartheid regime, which also coincided with a period of massive growth for the university. It was desegregated once again, prior to the abolition of apartheid, in 1990. Several of apartheid's most provocative critics, of either European or African descent, were one-time students and graduates of the university.

Growth and opposition to apartheid: 1959–1994

As the university continued to grow (from a mere 6,275 students in 1963, to 10,600 in 1975, to over 16,400 by 1985), the expansion of the university's campus became imperative. In 1964, the medical library and administrative offices of the Faculty of Medicine moved to Esselen Street, in the Hillbrow district of Johannesburg. In 1968, the Graduate School of Business was opened in Parktown. A year later, the Ernest Oppenheimer Hall of Residence and Savernake, the new residence of the Vice-Chancellor (replacing Hofmeyr House on the main campus) were both established, also in Parktown. That same year, the Medical School's new clinical departments were opened.

During the course of the 1960s, Wits acquired a limestone cave renowned for its archaeological material located at Sterkfontein. A farm next to Sterkfontein named Swartkrans rich in archaeological material was purchased in 1968, and excavation rights were obtained for archaeological and palaeontological purposes at Makapansgat, located in Limpopo Province.

The 1960s also witnessed widespread protest against apartheid policies. This resulted in numerous police invasions of campus to break up peaceful protests, as well as the banning, deportation and detention of many students and staff. Government funding for the university was cut, with funds originally meant for Wits often being channelled to the more conservative Afrikaans universities instead. Nonetheless, in the words of Clive Chipkin, the "university environment was filled with deep contradictions", and the university community was by no means wholly united in opposition to apartheid. This stemmed from the Wits Council being dominated by "highly conservative members representing mining and financial interests", and was compounded by the fact that the mining industry provided major financial support for the university. With a strongly entrenched "[c]olonial mentality" at Wits, along with "high capitalism, the new liberalism and communism of a South African kind, combined with entrenched white settler mores (particularly in the Engineering and Science faculties) ... the university ... was an arena of conflicting positions generally contained within polite academic conventions".

The 1970s saw the construction of Jubilee Hall and the Wartenweiler Library, as well as the opening of the Tandem Accelerator; the first, and to date only, nuclear facility at a South African university. In 1976, Lawson's Corner in Braamfontein was acquired and renamed University Corner. Senate House, the university's main administrative building, was completed in 1977. The university underwent a significant expansion programme in the 1980s. The Medical School was moved to new premises on York Street in Parktown on 30 August 1982. Additionally, in 1984 the university acquired the Milner Park showgrounds from the Witwatersrand Agricultural Society. These became West Campus, with the original campus becoming East Campus. In 1984, the Chamber of Mines building opened. A large walkway named the Amic Deck was constructed across the De Villiers Graaff Motorway which bisects the campus, linking East Campus with West Campus.

The 1980s also witnessed a period of heightened opposition to apartheid, as the university struggled to maintain its autonomy in the face of attacks from the apartheid state. Wits looked anew to the "Open Universities" statement of 1957, to which the University of the Western Cape now also added its voice. As the apartheid government attempted, through the threat of financial sanctions, to bring Wits under firmer control, protest escalated culminating in the General Assembly of 28 October 1987, at which the university reiterated its commitment to the values underlying the "Open Universities" statement.

University management itself came under increasing grassroots pressure to implement change within the university. A Wits-initiated research project, Perspectives of Wits (POW), published in 1986, revealed a surprising disconnect between the perceptions disadvantaged communities had of Wits and the image Wits had been attempting to convey of itself as a progressive opponent of apartheid. POW, which had involved interviews with members of organisations among disadvantaged communities in the PWV area, international academics, students and staff at Wits, and even a meeting with the then-banned ANC in Lusaka, revealed that to many in the surrounding disadvantaged communities, there was a perception of Wits as an elitist institution dominated by white interests. A need was identified for further transformation of the university.

However, instead of translating POW's proposals into institutional plans for transformation, Wits reacted in a defensive manner and refused to even acknowledge many of the criticisms that had been raised. Within the university community the perception was different—it was felt that Wits was on the right track. The contradiction between internal and external perceptions would increasingly undermine the unity of the university community, as progressive elements on campus began to take more radical positions in opposition to apartheid. Internal debates about, among other things, the international academic boycott of South Africa and the role of academics in the anti-apartheid struggle led to increasing division within the university. University management was increasingly seen as isolated and out of touch, and began to be referred to by the metonym "the eleventh floor", referring to the eleventh floor of Senate House where top management at Wits is located.

Nonetheless, the university community in general continued to uphold its opposition to apartheid and its commitment to university autonomy and academic freedom. The remainder of the 1980s saw numerous protests on campus, which often ended with police invasions of the university. In 1990, when Nelson Mandela was released, the students of Men's Res, on East Campus, unofficially renamed the lawn outside their residence "Mandela Square".

Post-apartheid: 1994–present
On 25 February 2000, university management began implementing a policy called "Wits 2001" under which work deemed 'non-core' to the functioning of the university (such as cleaning and landscaping) was outsourced to external contractors; the university's academic departments were also restructured: the university's nine faculties were reduced to five, the university's 99 departments were merged into 40 schools, and courses that were deemed redundant following a mass review were cancelled. Wits management did, however, initiate programmes to ameliorate some of the negative effects of Wits 2001. These included the implementation of early retirement and voluntary severance packages to minimise retrenchments. Additionally, many of the affected employees' children were studying at Wits at the time, and received bursaries as part of their parents' employment contracts with Wits. The university therefore continued to offer bursaries to them until the completion of the degrees for which they were then enrolled, as well as offering bursaries to the children of affected employees who matriculated in 2000.

Wits 2001 attracted widespread criticism from the workers and staff affected, as well as from students and other staff. The arguments behind the restructuring were criticised as badly reasoned, and the policy itself was criticised as being regressive and neoliberal. The then-vice-chancellor, Professor Colin Bundy, said in defence of Wits 2001 that "[t]his fundamental reorganisation of both academic activities and support services will equip the university for the challenges of higher education in the 21st Century". Management issued a statement on 30 May 2000 responding to criticism of Wits 2001 from the National Education, Health and Allied Workers' Union (NEHAWU), the largest trade union among Wits employees, in which it defended Wits 2001 as constituting the "outsourcing [of] contracts for certain non-core functions, rather than any shift in ownership relations or governance" contra NEHAWU's claims that it constituted privatisation. Management further defended the changes as "improving the financial sustainability of Wits, taking pressure off management and students, and allowing for better academic and support facilities and services". Along with "Igoli 2002" in Johannesburg, Wits 2001 was one of the policies implemented in the early 2000s which resulted in the formation of the Anti-Privatisation Forum (APF).

In 2001, the Johannesburg College of Education was incorporated into the university as Wits Education Campus under the national Department of Education's plan to reform tertiary education in South Africa. In 2003, a student mall, called the Matrix, was opened in the Student Union Building on East Campus.

In 2015 to 2016, the FeesMustFall movement and protests resulted in shut downs at Wits and other leading South African universities. In March 2021, one person was killed at the Braamfontein campus after police fired rubber bullets at students protesting the university's decision to bar students owing more than 150,000 rand from registering for the new academic year. According to the university, it is owed over a billion rand from students over the last seven years and was at risk of financial unsustainability.

Coat of arms
The current coat of arms of the university was designed by Professor G. E. Pearse, and edited by Professor W. D. Howie to correct heraldic inaccuracies, before being accepted by the State Herald of South Africa in 1972. The design of the coat of arms incorporates a gold background in the upper section of the shield to represent the Witwatersrand gold fields – on which the mining industry that gave rise to the university is based – along with an open book superimposed upon a cogwheel, representing knowledge and industry. The silver wavy bars on the lower section of the shield represent the Vaal and Limpopo rivers which form the northern and southern borders of the Witwatersrand gold fields. Above the shield is the head of a Kudu, an antelope typical of the Witwatersrand and the university's mascot. The university's motto, "Scientia et Labore", meaning "Through Knowledge and Work" in Latin, appears just below the shield.

The university's coat of arms evolved from the badge of the South African School of Mines. This badge consisted of a diamond with a shield superimposed upon it. A prospector's pick and a sledge hammer overlaid with broken ore and a mill appeared on the shield. The South African School of Mine's motto was the same as the university's current one, and surrounded the shield.

Governance and administration

As set out in the Higher Education Act (Act No. 101 of 1997) and in the Statute of the University of the Witwatersrand, the university is governed by Council. The Chancellor of the university is the ceremonial head of the university who, in the name of the university, confers all degrees. The positions of Principal and Vice-Chancellor are merged, with the Vice-Chancellor responsible for the day-to-day running of the university and accountable to Council. Council is responsible for the selection of all Vice-Chancellors, Deputy Vice-Chancellors and Deans of Faculty.

The responsibility for regulating all teaching, research and academic functions of the university falls on Senate. Additionally, the interests of the university's students are represented by the Students' Representative Council (SRC), which also selects representatives to Senate and Council.

Campuses

The university is divided into five academic campuses, the main administrative campus is East Campus. Across the De Villiers Graaff Motorway lies West Campus. The two are joined by a brick-paved walkway across the highway called the Amic Deck. East and West Campus effectively form a single campus, bordered by Empire Road to the north, Jan Smuts Avenue to the east, Jorrissen Street and Enoch Sontonga Road to the south and Annet Road to the west. The historic East Campus is primarily the home of the faculties of Science and Humanities, as well as the University Council, Senate and management. West Campus houses the faculties of Engineering and the Built Environment, and Commerce, Law and Management. East Campus is home to four residences, namely Men's Res (male), Sunnyside (female), International House (mixed) and Jubilee Hall (female). West Campus is home to David Webster Hall (female), Barnato Hall and West Campus Village (both mixed).

Wits has three more academic campuses, all located in Parktown. Wits Education Campus (WEC) houses the school of education, within the Faculty of Humanities. WEC boasts three female residences, forming the Highfield cluster, namely Girton, Medhurst and Reith Hall. East of WEC (across York Road), lies Wits Medical Campus which is the administration and academic centre of the Faculty of Health Sciences. West of WEC (across Victoria Avenue) lies the Wits Management Campus, with the Wits Business School. Within the Wits Management Campus are the Ernest Oppenheimer Hall (male residence) and the mixed Parktown Village.

There are centres that are not academic although referred to by the university as campuses. These are Graduate Lodge, Campus Lodge, South Court and Braamfontein Centre; all in the city district of Braamfontein and all mixed gender. Furthermore, there is the Wits Junction (mixed) and the Knockando Halls of Residence (a male residence located on the grounds of a Parktown mansion called Northwards) in Parktown, and the mixed Esselen Street Residence in Hillbrow.

Sites

Provincial heritage sites and heritage objects
The University of the Witwatersrand houses two provincial heritage sites and two heritage objects. The Great Hall (technically the façade of the Robert Sobukwe Building, formerly known as Central Block, in which the Great Hall is located), and the Dias Cross housed in the William Cullen Library are both provincial heritage sites. They were formerly national monuments, until 1 April 2000 when the National Monuments Council was replaced by a new system which made former national monuments the responsibility of provincial governments following the passage of the National Heritage Resources Act. The heritage objects are Jan Smuts' study, housed in Jan Smuts House, and the Paul Loewenstein Collection of rock art. All of the university's national heritage sites and objects are located on East Campus.

Wits Institute of Social and Economic Research (WiSER)

The University of the Witwatersrand is home to the Wits Institute of Social and Economic Research (WiSER), founded in 2001 by Deborah Posel.

Cradle of Humankind

Wits acquired the Sterkfontein and Swartkrans sites in the 1960s, both of which were rich in fossil remains of early hominids. In 1999, the area was declared a World Heritage Site by UNESCO as the Cradle of Humankind. As a World Heritage Site, responsibility for the site shifted from the university to the government of Gauteng Province, with the provincial government becoming the designated management authority responsible for developing and protecting the site. It is aided by the South African Heritage Resources Agency, which has also declared the area a national heritage site. The university's archaeology and palaeontology departments, within the School of Geosciences of the Faculty of Science, continue to play a leading part in excavations of the site; and Wits retains ownership of Sterkfontein's intellectual rights. Professor Lee Berger discovered Australopithecus sediba (2010) and Homo naledi (2015) at the site.

Museums

The university hosts at least fourteen museums. These include the Adler Museum of Medicine, the Palaeontology Museum and the only Geology Museum in Gauteng Province. The displays include a vast spectra not limited to the Taung skull, various dinosaur fossils and butterflies.

Rock art
The Roberts-Pager Collection of Khoisan rock art copies is located in the Van Riet Lowe building on East Campus.

Johannesburg Planetarium

The Johannesburg Planetarium was the first full-sized planetarium in Africa and the second in the Southern Hemisphere. It was originally bought by the Johannesburg municipality to be set up as part of the celebration of the city's seventieth anniversary. After acquiring an old projector from the Hamburg Planetarium, which was modernised before being shipped to South Africa, the municipality sold the projector to the university for use as both an academic facility for the instruction of students, and as a public amenity. Plans for a new building to house the projector were first drawn up in 1958, and construction began in 1959. The planetarium finally opened on 12 October 1960. The Johannesburg Planetarium is often consulted by the media, and the public, in order to explain unusual occurrences in the skies over South Africa. In 2010, the Johannesburg Planetarium celebrated its golden jubilee.

Wits Art Museum
The museum's collection started in the 1950s and has since grown substantially. In 1972 the Gertrude Posel Gallery was established on the ground floor of Senate House on East Campus. It was joined in 1992 by the Studio Gallery which formed the "lower gallery" reserved for the display of African art. The galleries' collections grew steadily, with the Studio Gallery becoming renowned for having one of the best collections of African beadwork in the world, and by 2002 it was decided that more space was needed. Thus, the Gertrude Posel Gallery and the Studio Galley were closed. The ground floor of University Corner was selected as the site for the new Wits Art Museum, which now houses the collections after it was completed and launched in 2012.

Wits Theatre

The Wits Theatre is a performing arts complex within the university, although it also caters for professional companies, dance studios and schools. It is run by the university's Performing Arts Administration (PAA). Prior to the opening of the Wits Theatre, the Wits Schools of Dramatic Art and Music had been staging productions in a building on campus called the Nunnery, a former convent. The Nunnery has been retained as a teaching venue.

Wits Centre for Diversity Studies (WiCDS) 

The Wits Centre for Diversity Studies (WiCDS) was established in 2014 at the University of Witwatersrand. It is based in the Faculty of Humanities and aims to build capacity to meet the challenges of diverse societies, especially in post-apartheid South Africa through interdisciplinary postgraduate education and research.

Academics

Research
Wits University is the home to 28 South African Research Initiative (SARChI) Chairs and six DST-NRF Centres of Excellence. There are just more than 423 NRF rated researchers, of which 28 are 'international leading scholars' in their research fields, or so called A-rated researchers. The university also has a wide range of research entities including 10 national Centres of Excellence.

Faculties
The university consists of five faculties: Commerce, Law and Management; Engineering and the Built Environment; Health Sciences; Humanities; and Science.

Commerce, Law, and Management
This Faculty currently offers various undergraduate and postgraduate degrees  in accountancy, economics, management, and law. The faculty participates in the WitsPlus programme, a part-time programme for students, and is based in the Commerce, Law and Management Building on West Campus.

Engineering and the Built Environment

This Faculty is made up of 7 schools being: Architecture & Planning, Chemical and Metallurgical Engineering, Civil & Environmental Engineering, Construction Economics & Management, Electrical & Information Engineering, Mechanical, Industrial & Aeronautical Engineering and Mining Engineering. The faculty is based in the Chamber of Mines Building on West Campus, which houses the faculty office and the Engineering Library. The School of Civil & Environmental Engineering and Chemical and Metallurgical Engineering are located in the Hillman and Richard Ward Buildings on the East Campus respectively.

Health Sciences
This Faculty is based on the Wits Health Sciences Campus in Parktown, and consists of the School of Anatomical Sciences; Clinical Medicine; Oral Health Sciences; Pathology; Public Health; Physiology; and Therapeutic Sciences. This Faculty uses the Chris Hani Baragwanath Academic Hospital, the Charlotte Maxeke Johannesburg Academic Hospital, the Helen Joseph Hospital, and the Rahima Moosa Mother and Child Hospital as its main teaching hospitals. It also utilizes facilities throughout Gauteng, North West Province, and Mpumalanga. The Faculty runs a graduate entry medical and physiotherapy programme, masters courses (science, medicine and dentistry) and a PhD programme.

Humanities

This Faculty is based in the South West Engineering Building on East Campus and consists of the schools of Social Sciences, Literature and Language Studies, Human and Community Development, Arts, and Education.

Science

The Faculty is based in the Mathematical Sciences Building within the Wits Science Stadium on Braamfontein Campus West and consists of the schools of Animal, Plant and Environmental Sciences; Chemistry; Physics; Molecular and Cell Biology; Geography, Archaeology and Environmental Studies; Geosciences; Mathematics; Statistics and Actuarial Science and School of Computer Science and Applied Mathematics.

Libraries

The University of the Witwatersrand Library Service consists of two main libraries, the Warteinweiler and William Cullen libraries on East Campus and twelve branch libraries. The Wartenweiler Library primarily serves the Faculty of Humanities. It also contains the Library Administration, Library Computer Services and Technical Services departments as well as the Short Loan collection, the Reference collection, Inter-library Loans department, the Multimedia Library, and the Education and Training department as well as the Electronic Classroom. The William Cullen Library contains the Africana collection, specialising in social, political and economic history. It also contains the Early and Fine Printed Books collection, which includes the Incunabula (books printed before 1501). Finally, it also contains a collection of Government Publications and journals in the arts, humanities and social sciences.

The branch libraries are:
 The Martienssen Library for the Built Environment, which serves the schools of architecture and planning and construction management within the Faculty of Engineering and the Built Environment. It is located in the John Moffat Building (also known as the Architecture Building) on East Campus.
 The Biological & Physical Sciences Library which is situated in the Oppenheimer Life Sciences Building on East Campus and serves the Faculty of Science, together with the Geomaths Library.
 The Commerce Library which, along with the Wits Library of Management, serves the schools of commerce and management. It is located to the west of the Tower of Light on West Campus.
 The Education Library (also known as the Harold Holmes Library) which is located on Wits Education Campus in Parktown and serves the school of education within the Faculty of Humanities.
 The Engineering Library, which is located in the Chamber of Mines Building on West Campus and serves the schools of engineering within the Faculty of Engineering and the Built Environment.
 The GeoMaths Library, which is situated in the basement of Senate House on East Campus and serves a range of schools within the faculties of Science, Engineering and the Built Environment, and Humanities.
 The Witwatersrand Health Sciences Library (WHSL) which serves the Faculty of Health Sciences. It is divided into four branches, one of which (formerly at Helen Joseph Hospital) is now a "virtual library" available only online. Two of the other branches are at the Wits Medical Campus in Parktown, while the remaining branch is at the Chris Hani Baragwanath Hospital in Soweto.
 The Wits Library of Management, which, together with the Commerce Library, serves the schools of commerce and management. It is located in the Donald Gordon Building on the Management Campus in Parktown.
 The Law Library which serves the school of law within the Faculty of Commerce, Law and Management. It is located in the Oliver Schreiner Law Building on West Campus. Unlike the university's other libraries, the Law Library is governed directly by the school of law, rather than by the University of the Witwatersrand Library.

Reputation and ranking

In 2019 Wits was ranked 201–300 globally and 2nd nationally in the Academic Ranking of World Universities (ARWU), commonly known as Shanghai Ranking. In the 2019/2020 Centre for World University Rankings (CWUR) Wits is ranked 254 globally (top 1.3% in the world). In the 2019 US News Best global Universities Rankings, Wits was ranked 2nd in Africa and #197 globally with a Global score of 59.9. Wits ranked #194 globally in the 2020 Times Higher Education World University Rankings.

The University of Witwatersrand Business School was ranked 6th best among all business schools in Africa and the Middle East in the 2010 according to the QS Global 200 Business Schools Report. Additionally, the Business School's MBA program has been ranked as the top MBA program in South Africa by the Financial Mail for the past 6 years.

Frankenwald controversy

In 1905 the mining magnate Alfred Beit donated a large piece of land, Frankenwald Estate, north of Johannesburg, to the Transvaal Colony to be used for 'educational purposes' – the land was transferred to Wits in 1922 by an Act of Parliament. According to the Mail & Guardian the university entered into an agreement in 2001 with a private developer, to build a shopping centre, offices, light industry and medium and high-density housing on the property.

Student demographics
Like other South African universities, the University of Witwatersrand promotes diversity in order to address the widespread inequality and injustice caused by apartheid across South Africa. For this reason, the university's admission policies promote diversity and Black Economic Empowerment by admitting students from a wide range of backgrounds. These policies enable the university to assemble a diverse student body that reflects the demographic profile of South Africa's Gauteng region across a wide array of traits, including race, gender, socio-economic background, urban and rural geographic origin, culture, ethnicity, disability, religion, sexual orientation, national origin, and other traits.

Racial composition
The racial composition of the university's student population is as follows:

Gender composition
The gender composition of the university is shown below.

Wits Enterprise
Wits Enterprise is wholly owned by University of the Witwatersrand, Johannesburg to commercialise the intellectual property of the university.  They are also responsible for short courses, technology transfer and research support.

Notable alumni and academics

John Burland, Professor of Soil Mechanics, Imperial College London. Well known for stabilizing The Leaning Tower of Pisa
Cheryl Cohen, alumna, professor and public health researcher
Stephanie (Greenberg) Lowrance, Architect
Jef Valkeniers, Doctor and Politician

Nobel Prize Laureates
Aaron Klug, 1982 Nobel Prize in Chemistry
Nadine Gordimer, 1991 Nobel Prize in Literature
Nelson Mandela, who attended but did not graduate from the university, 1993 Nobel Peace Prize
Sydney Brenner, 2002 Nobel Prize in Physiology or Medicine

See also
 Dawn of Humanity (2015 PBS film)
 Widdringtonia whytei

References

Bibliography
  Online . Print .
 The Golden Jubilee of the University of the Witwatersrand 1972  (Jubilee Committee, University of the Witwatersrand Press)
 Wits: The Early Years : a History of the University of the Witwatersrand Johannesburg and its Precursors 1896 – 1936 1982 Bruce Murray  (University of the Witwatersrand Press)
 Wits Sport: An Illustrated History of Sport at the University of the Witwatersrand 1989 Jonty Winch  (Windsor)
 Wits: A University in the Apartheid Era by Mervyn Shear (1996)  (University of the Witwatersrand Press)
 Wits: The "Open Years": A History of the University of the Witwatersrand, Johannesburg, 1939–1959 1997 Bruce Murray  (University of the Witwatersrand Press)
 A Vice-Chancellor Remembers: the Memoirs of Professor G.R. Bozzoli 1995 Guerino Bozzoli  (Alphaprint)
 Wits Library: a Centenary History 1998 Reuben Musiker & Naomi Musiker  (Scarecrow Books)

External links

History of Transvaal University College
Rock art within Google Arts & Culture

 
Schools in Johannesburg
Business schools in South Africa
Public universities in South Africa
Universities in Gauteng
Educational institutions established in 1896
1896 establishments in the Cape Colony